Nehenjeh (also Romanized as Nahenjeh; also known as Nanjeh  and Nenjeh) is a village in Tork-e Gharbi Rural District, Jowkar District, Malayer County, Hamadan Province, Iran. At the 2006 census, its population was 202, in 56 families.

References 

Populated places in Malayer County